Valdegovía/Gaubea is a town and municipality located in the province of Álava, in the Basque Country (autonomous community), northern Spain.

The town-hall is located in Villanueva de Valdegovía / Uribarri Gaubea. There is a factory producing mantecadas in Tuesta.

Villages
The municipal term includes 30 small villages, some of which are grouped in Concejos:

 Acebedo
 Astúlez
 Bachicabo
 Barrio
 Basabe
 Bóveda
 Caranca y Mioma, Concejo formed by Caranca and Mioma villages
 Karkamu (Cárcamo)
 Corro
 Espejo
 Fresneda
 Ginea
 Gurendes-Quejo, Concejo formed by Gurendes and Quejo
 Nograro
 Osma
 Pinedo
 Quintanilla
 Tobillas
 Tuesta
 Valderejo, Concejo formed by Lahoz, Lalastra, Ribera and Villamardones
 Valluerca
 Villamaderne, includes Bellojín village
 Villanañe
 Villanueva de Valdegovía-Uribarri Gaubea, main town

Gallery

External links

 VALDEGOVÍA / GAUBEA in the Bernardo Estornés Lasa - Auñamendi Encyclopedia (Euskomedia Fundazioa) 

Municipalities in Álava